Lee Seung-joon (born February 11, 1973) is a South Korean actor. Active in theater, Lee is also known for his supporting roles onscreen, notably in the blockbuster epic The Admiral: Roaring Currents and the romance drama Discovery of Love.

Filmography

Film

Television series

Web series

Music video

Theater

References

External links
 Lee Seung-joon at HM Entertainment 
 
 

1973 births
Living people
20th-century South Korean male actors
21st-century South Korean male actors
South Korean male film actors
South Korean male television actors
South Korean male stage actors
Seoul Institute of the Arts alumni